Pizzo di Campedell is a mountain in the Lepontine Alps, located on the border between the Swiss cantons of Ticino and Graubünden. It lies on the range south of Torent Alto between the valley of the Ticino and the Val Calanca.

References

External links
Pizzo di Campedell on Hikr

Lepontine Alps
Mountains of the Alps
Mountains of Graubünden
Mountains of Ticino
Graubünden–Ticino border
Mountains of Switzerland
Two-thousanders of Switzerland
Calanca